Vairavapatti is a village in the Tirupattur taluk Sivaganga district of Tamil Nadu, India. This village derives its name from the temple dedicated to Lord Kala Bhairav who is known in Tamil language as Vairavan.  It is 2 km from the Pillayarpatti village which is another famous pilgrimage center. It is one of the 9 temples held in high esteem by the Nagarathar Chettiar community of Tamil Nadu. The presiding deity here is Lord Valaroli Nathar and his consort Vadivudai Ammai. Bhairavar here is prominent, hence the name Vairavan-patti in Tamil.

References 

Villages in Sivaganga district